The Portuguese Women's Volleyball Super Cup is the women’s volleyball competition which consists of a match played by the champion of the National Championship and the winner of the National Cup. In case the same club wins both (Championship and Cup) during the same season, the National Cup runner-up is selected to be the opponent at the Super Cup. It is organized and administrated by the Portuguese Volleyball Federation (FPV) and the first edition (won by Leixões SC) took place in 1989. The tournament was not held from 2002 until 2014, returning in 2015. Castêlo da Maia GC is the most successful club in the competition, having won the title in six occasions.

Results

Titles by club

References
 Portuguese Volleyball Federation

Volleyball competitions in Portugal